Ella Koon Yun-na (born 9 July 1979) is a former Hong Kong Cantopop singer and semi-retired actress.

Biography
Ella Koon was born in the French Polynesian island of Tahiti, and is of Hakka descent. She was raised in Hong Kong and attended high school in Birmingham, England. Koon is multilingual and speaks Hakka, Cantonese, English, Mandarin, and some French. Koon also plays the Guzheng, a traditional Chinese musical instrument with 21 strings, as well as the Guitar and Piano. She is not a French citizen.

Entertainment career
After completing her studies in England, Koon returned to Hong Kong in 2000 where she began her modeling career for various magazines, advertisements and commercials. Modelling became her full-time profession. 

In 2001, she landed her first movie role in "I Do". After the movie, she continued modelling; then in 2004 she was invited to attend a singing audition. The audition landed her a contract with Boombeat Music and launched her singing career. Her first few albums – "Original", "Ellacadabra" (2005), "Lose Sanity" (2006) and the EP "Stages" (2008) were not particularly acclaimed. But as a singer on The Voice singing "Endless Love" she impressed audiences and further propelled her singing career.

Koon also starred in the popular TVB's drama series "Revolving Door of Vengeance" in 2005 and "Survivor's Law II " in 2007. In "Revolving Door of Vengeance" she played "Hoi Sum" (meaning 'happy' in Cantonese), a carefree and happy-go-lucky girl. In "Survivor's Law II," she won the audience again with her character as "Lily" the sassy and stylish lawyer who could hold her own in the courtroom. Besides the drama series, Koon has been invited as a guest to several TVB games shows and was a host for two food travel shows with notable Hong Kong Chefs. Indeed, her most recent work with Kelvin Pan (Pan Kai Tai) has boosted her into the pinnacle of Hong Kong entertainment business.

“I Do" was just the first of many movies Koon appeared and started in. She also landed roles in movies such as My Sweetie (甜絲絲, 2004), Drink, Drank, Drunk (千杯不醉, 2005), Ice Age 2: The Meltdown (冰河世紀二, 2006), The Shopaholics (最愛女人購物狂, 2006), Without Words (地老天荒, 2006), Undercover Hidden Dragon (至尊無賴, 2006), Arthur and the Minimoys (迷你魔界大冒險, 2007), Muddy but Pure White (泥巴色的純白, 2008), Playboy Cops (花花型警, 2008), Look for a Star (游龍戲鳳, 2008), Short of Love (矮仔多情, 2009) and Ice Age 3: Dawn of the Dinosaurs (冰河世紀三, 2009). She Played the role of Merry in the Clement Cheng movie 'Merry-go-round' (2010) in which her talent expresses perfectly.

Incident
In 2006, during promoting a Mid-Autumn Festival event, Ella was assaulted on stage by a man, later identified as Kalton Pan, a 22-year-old male. The man was immediately arrested and later sentenced to 9 months imprisonment. Ella was not harmed by the incident and decided against pursuing legal action against the man.

In September 2014, Ella was diagnosed with Bell's palsy, which made her right side of her face paralyzed.

Discography
Original (2004)
Ellacadabra (2005)
Lose Sanity 失常 (2006)
Stages (2008)
Being (2010)
Take A Shine To... (2011)
Wanna Be (2013)

Filmography

References

External links

Ella's Official Website
Ella's Official Weibo Blog
 Ella's Official Facebook Fan Page
Ella's Official Yahoo! BLOG
Ella's Official Artist Profile Page on AliveNotDead
 Ella's Official Jacso Blog
Ella's new EP interview July 2010

1979 births
Living people
Cantopop singers
Hong Kong television actresses
Hong Kong film actresses
Hong Kong people of Hakka descent
French Polynesian people of Chinese descent
People from Bao'an County
TVB actors
Guzheng players
21st-century Hong Kong actresses
Hakka musicians
Hong Kong idols